Siege of Chittorgarh may refer to:

 Siege of Chittorgarh (1303), in which the Delhi Sultanate ruler Alauddin Khalji defeated the Guhila king Ratnasimha.
 Siege of Chittorgarh (1535), in which Bahadur Shah of Gujarat defeated the Mewar regent Rani Karnavati after which she committed Jauhar.
 Siege of Chittorgarh (1567–1568), in which the Mughal emperor Akbar defeated Rao Jaimal of Merta.